The Milwaukee Brewers are a Major League Baseball team based in Milwaukee, Wisconsin, U.S.

Milwaukee Brewers may also refer to the following historical American professional baseball teams:
Milwaukee Brewers (Union Association), an 1884 major-league team
 1884 Milwaukee Brewers season, in which the team compiled an 8–5 record
Milwaukee Brewers (1886–1892), a minor-league team that completed for part of the 1891 season in the major-league American Association
 1891 Milwaukee Brewers season, in which the team compiled a 21–15 record 
Milwaukee Brewers (1894–1901), a team that competed in the minor leagues during 1894–1900, then the major-league American League in 1901
 1901 Milwaukee Brewers season, in which the team compiled a 48–89 record, then relocated and became the St. Louis Browns
Milwaukee Brewers (American Association), a minor-league team that competed in the American Association from 1902 to 1952

See also